Marcel Dzama (born May 4, 1974) is a contemporary artist from Winnipeg, Manitoba, Canada who currently lives and works in New York City. His work has been exhibited internationally, in particular his ink and watercolor drawings.

Education
Dzama received his BFA from the University of Manitoba in 1997.

Work
Dzama works extensively in sculpture, painting, collage, and film. The artist is also known for his intricate dioramas and large scale polyptychs that draw from his talents across a range of media. Dzama works in multiple disciplines to bring his cast of human figures, animals, and imaginary hybrids to life, and has developed an international reputation and following for his art that depicts fanciful, anachronistic worlds. The artist is also known for his work with The Royal Art Lodge.

He was the inspiration for Deco Dawson's 2001 short film FILM(dzama).

Dzama's work has been used on the covers of numerous record albums, notably The Else by They Might Be Giants, Guero by Beck and Reconstruction Site by The Weakerthans. He also provided the cover art for literary critic Sianne Ngai's 2005 book Ugly Feelings, published by Harvard University Press. His costume designs can be seen in music videos for the Bob Dylan song, "When the Deal Goes Down", the N.A.S.A. song, "The People Tree", and the Department of Eagles song, "No One Does It Like You", which he also co-directed. McSweeney's has published two collections of his work, The Berlin Years in 2003 (reprinted in 2006) and a follow-up, The Berliner Ensemble Thanks You All, in 2008.

In 2010, composer Ed Bennett created "Dzama Stories", a piece of music inspired by Marcel Dzama, featuring Decibel and Paul Dunmall. It is music for amplified ensemble, electronics and improviser.

Special projects
In 2016, Dzama created the costume and stage design for the New York City Ballet's The Most Incredible Thing, a performance based on Hans Christian Andersen's fairy tale.

Exhibitions
Dzama has been the subject of solo exhibitions at the Musée d'Art Contemporain de Montréal (2010) and Pinakothek der Moderne, Munich (2008). In 2006, he had an exhibition at the Ikon Gallery in Birmingham, England, which traveled to the Centre for Contemporary Arts in Glasgow, Scotland.

Marcel Dzama cites Marcel Duchamp as one of his greatest inspirations and has drawn on the artist’s near-obsession with chess as a starting point for his video A Game of Chess, 2011, in which life-size Kings, Queens, Rooks and pawns duel for supremacy in a production brought to life in Guadalajara, Mexico. The film is included in the collection of the National Gallery of Canada.

Over the past decade, his work has been featured in numerous international exhibitions, including Compass in Hand: Selections from The Judith Rothschild Foundation Contemporary Drawings Collection at The Museum of Modern Art, New York (2009); Moby Dick at CCA Wattis Institute for Contemporary Arts, San Francisco (2009); Sobey Art Award Short List at the Art Gallery of Nova Scotia (2009); Wunderkammer: A Century of Curiosities at The Museum of Modern Art, New York (2008); In Me / Out of Me at P.S.1 Contemporary Art Center, New York and Kunst-Werke, Berlin (2007). In 2006, he was included in the Whitney Biennial exhibition, Down By Law: Day for Night at the Whitney Museum of American Art in New York. In the late 1990s, Dzama participated in the group exhibitions Greetings from Winnipeg at the Minneapolis College of Art & Design, Minneapolis and Contemporary American Realist Drawings, the Jalane and Richard Davidson Collection at The Art Institute of Chicago (both 1999). In May 2016 at the Labs Gallery in Bologna  was presented an exhibition of his works entitled "Masked Tales", in which also exposed an italian artist Vanni Cuoghi.

Collections
Dzama's work is in the collections of major museums and public institutions, including: 
 the Andy Warhol Foundation for the Visual Arts, New York 
 the Bass Museum of Art, Miami; the Centre Georges Pompidou, Paris 
 the Corcoran Gallery of Art, Washington, D.C. 
 the Dallas Museum of Art 
 the Metropolitan Museum of Art, New York 
 the Museum of Contemporary Art, North Miami
 the Museum of Modern Art, New York 
 the Musée d’art contemporain de Montréal
the National Gallery of Canada
 The Rhode Island School of Design Museum, Providence, Rhode Island
the Tate Museum, London, UK

References

External links
 Marcel Dzama at David Zwirner
 Marcel Dzama at Sies + Höke
 Selected Press at David Zwirner
 Marcel Dzama on Artnet
 Marcel Dzama: Even the Ghost of the Past at Strand Bookstore
 The New York Times Magazine "Drawn to Trouble"
 NOW Magazine "Drawing power: Marcel Dzama"
 BBC Collective Video tour of show at Ikon Gallery, interview, image gallery
 BBC Imagine Exquisite corpse to which Dzama contributed

1974 births
Artists from New York City
Artists from Winnipeg
Canadian contemporary artists
Canadian graphic designers
Living people
University of Manitoba alumni